The Jamaica Civil Aviation Authority (JCAA) is the civil aviation authority of Jamaica. Established in 1996, it is under the Ministry of Transport and Mining. The JCAA is headquartered in Kingston.

Aircraft accident investigations
 American Airlines Flight 331

References

External links
 

Ministries and agencies of the government of Jamaica
Jamaica
Aviation organisations based in Jamaica
Organizations investigating aviation accidents and incidents